Yevgeny Kafelnikov was the defending champion, but did not compete this year.

Martin Sinner won the title by defeating Andrei Olhovskiy 6–7(3–7), 7–6(10–8), 6–3 in the final.

Seeds

Draw

Finals

Top half

Bottom half

References

External links
 Official results archive (ATP)
 Official results archive (ITF)

1995 Copenhagen Open – 1
1995 ATP Tour